The Ministry of Science, Technological Development and Innovation is a ministry in the Serbian government. It originally existed as the ministry of science from 1991 to 2004 and then under various different names from 2004 to 2011, when it was merged into the education ministry. The ministry was re-established as a separate entity with the formation of the third cabinet of Ana Brnabić on 26 October 2022.

The current minister in Jelena Begović, a non-partisan figure nominated by the Serbian Progressive Party. The assistant minister is Marina Soković, who was previously assistant minister in the ministry of education, science, and technological development from 2019 to 2022.

List of ministers
Political Party:

References

External links
Serbian Ministry of Science, Technological Development, and Innovation
Serbian ministries, etc – Rulers.org

Government ministries of Serbia
1991 establishments in Serbia
Ministries established in 1991
2011 disestablishments in Serbia
Ministries disestablished in 2011
2022 establishments in Serbia
Ministries established in 2022
Serbia